Ready Steady Go is a Pakistani sitcom television series directed by Kamran Ahmed Ali and written by Hassan Imam. It is aired on Play Entertainment weekly. Sitcom stars Maham Amir, Faizan Shaikh and Parveen Akber.

Plot
Sitcom is about lady Khairan (Parveen Akbar)
who is head of the family, who has weak and ill husband Wazeer Ahmed (Shafqat Khan). Despite not having money she was strict towards her two lazy sons Pyaare (Faizan Shaikh) and Babban (Aadi Adeel). Family is rented a portion in Noshi's (Maham Faizan) house, the two boys fall for young landlord. From there begins a story that how Noshi used Pyaare and Babban to do something for her every week which makes their mother mad at Noshi, since both ladies don't like each other.

Series overview

Cast and characters
Maham Amir as Noshi; A young landlord who owns a double storey house, lower part of her house rented to Khairan family. She is in love with Pyaare but his mother doesn't like Noshi, therefore drama is created in their house.
Parveen Akber as Khairan; A poverty stricken lady who is head of her family. She is seen mostly arguing with Noshi because of her behaviour and acts. She also abuses her sons for being jobless and lazy.
Shafqat Khan as Wazeer Ahmed; An ill and weak husband of Khairan who is surrounded by diseases. He is not bold enough to face his family issues therefore all problems are solved by his wife, Khairan.
Faizan Shaikh as Pyaare; Younger son of Khairan who loves poetry and has crush on Noshi.
Aadi Adeal as Babban; Elder son of Khairan who has gangster like appearance and try to make place in Noshi heart.

Guest appearances
Shamoon Abbasi as Gulu Kherian's brother
 Saqib Sameer as Kamala
 Shariq Mehmood as Wazeer's Brother
 Ali Khan as boxer
Rashid Farooqui as Rafeeq Bhai from Tere Naal Luv Hoga Hai Drama
Naseem Vicky

References

External links

Urdu-language television shows